Keys to the Kingdom may refer to:

Books 
 The Keys to the Kingdom, book series by Garth Nix
 The Key to the Kingdom, 2003 manga series

Films 
 Norm of the North: Keys to the Kingdom, sequel to the 2016 animated film Norm of the North

Music

Albums 
 Keys to the Kingdom (album), 2011 album by the North Mississippi Allstars
 The Key to the Kingdom, 1995 compilation album of gospel songs recorded on the Motown record label
 The Key To the Kingdom, 2009 album by Stephan Mathieu

Songs 
"Keys to the Kingdom" (song), 2014 song by Linkin Park
 "Key to the Kingdom", 1956 single by The Nutmegs
 "Key to the Kingdom", title track of a 2010 album by Lulu Roman
 "Key to the Kingdom", song by Spin Doctors on the 1999 album Here Comes the Bride
 "The Key to the Kingdom", song by Praga Khan on the 2003 album Not Strictly Rubens
 "Key to the Kingdom", song by Spencer Wiggins on the 2003 album of the same name
 "Keys to the Kingdom", song by The Myddle Class
 "Keys to the Kingdom", song by Group 1 Crew on the 2008 album Ordinary Dreamers
 "Keys to the Kingdom", song by Tiwa Savage and Mr Eazi on the 2019 album The Lion King: The Gift
 "I've Got a Key to the Kingdom", 1928 single by Blind Willie Davis, Paramount 12726
 "I've Got the Key to the Kingdom", 1929 single by Washington Phillips
 "The Key to My Kingdom", 1957 single by B.B. King and His Orchestra
 "Key to My Kingdom", song on the 2003 album of the same name by Enrico Crivellaro
 "Keys to the Kingdom", 2022 song by Sweet Taboo which represented California in the American Song Contest

See also
 Keys of the Kingdom (disambiguation)